Fairytale.Is is a 2012 Russian children's-fantasy-anthology film.

Plot
The picture consists of three short films.

In the first segment, Dasha quarrels with her father and mother and falls into the world of toys because of her yet unborn sister. Because of getting hit with a toy elephant, she gets transported into a new world - the world of toys. Her parents are dolls in this world. Their own daughter becomes her older sister.

In the second segment, the father-architect is fascinated by the project of creating a building for the circus and does not pay any attention to his son Fedya. He ends up spoiling the miniature of the building, and after a quarrel, his father is suddenly transferred to the inside of a circus which has not yet been built for a very unexpected performance.

The third segment tells of a certain school with strange rules. 12-year-old Vanya and a new teacher Svetlana, who came for an internship, find out that during the full moon the teachers and the school itself turn into a living nightmare.

Cast

Segment "The World of Toys" 
 Anfisa Wistinghausen - Dasha
 Elizaveta Boyarskaya - Mama
 Maksim Matveyev - Papa
 Mikhail Porechenkov - The Bear
 Konstantin Khabensky - Encyclopedia
 Andrey Smolyakov - Evil Clown
 Mikhail Trukhin - Player
 Darya Moroz - Barbie
 Svetlana Ivanova - Pupsik
 Sergey Ugryumov - Ken

Segment "Childhood Forever" 
 Vasily Brykov - Fedya
 Aleksei Serebryakov - Daddy
 Irina Pegova - Mama
 Artur Smolyaninov - The Hare
 Grigory Siyatvinda - Sprehshtalmeyster

Segment "Epischo" 
 Mikhail Kozakov - Stanislav Dalievich Salvadorov, director of the school
 Angelina Mirimskaya - Svetlana Krivosheeva
 Ksenia Rappoport - Gala Dmitrievna, the head teacher
 Gosha Kutsenko - Penkulturnik
 Sergey Burunov - Geokhim
 Alexander Komissarov - Himstorik Vissarionovich
 Alexander Usherdin - Timo Kultunen. workahall
 Yola Sanko - Stepanida Neck
 Svetlana Novikova - Aunt Shura
 Pyotr Skvortsov - Vanja Bystin-Okhlo
 Daniel Uskov - Fedya

References

External links

Russian children's fantasy films
2010s children's fantasy films
Russian anthology films
Films based on fairy tales